In the German school of swordsmanship, Mordhau, alternatively Mordstreich or Mordschlag (Ger., lit., "murder-stroke" or "murder-strike" or "murder-blow"), is a half-sword technique of holding the sword inverted, with both hands gripping the blade, and hitting the opponent with the pommel or crossguard. This technique allows the swordsman to essentially use the sword as a mace or hammer. The Mordhau is mainly used in armoured combat, although it can be used to surprise an opponent in close quarters.

References 
 Codex Wallerstein, ed. Zabinski, Paladin Press, (2002), .

Swordsmanship